The Mitchell Company Tournament of Champions was a golf tournament for professional female golfers on the LPGA Tour. It was played annually from 1994 to 2007 at various sites in the Southeastern United States. It was last played at the Robert Trent Jones Golf Trail Magnolia Grove Golf Course in Mobile, Alabama.

It was one of a small number of limited field events on the LPGA Tour. Only winners of an LPGA event from the previous four years, as well as active Hall of Fame members, were eligible for the tournament.

In 2004, the title sponsor became the Mitchell Company, a real estate development and management firm headquartered in Mobile, Alabama.

Tournament names through the years: 
 1994–1997: Chrysler-Plymouth Tournament of Champions
 1998:  Lifetime's AFLAC Tournament of Champions
 1999–2001: AFLAC Champions Presented by Southern Living
 2002–2003: Mobile LPGA Tournament of Champions
 2004–2006: The Mitchell Company Tournament of Champions presented by Kathy Ireland
 2007: The Mitchell Company LPGA Tournament of Champions

Winners

Tournament record

External links 
 LPGA official microsite

Former LPGA Tour events
Golf in Alabama
Sports in Mobile, Alabama
Events in Mobile, Alabama
Women's sports in Alabama